The Chase County Courthouse, located on Broadway between 9th and 10th Sts., Imperial, Nebraska, was built during 1910–1912 of dark brick and limestone trim, with Jacobethan features unique in Nebraska courthouses.

It was designed by architect A.T. Simmons of Bloomington, Illinois, who later designed the Dundy County Courthouse in adjacent Dundy County, Nebraska.

It was listed on the National Register of Historic Places in 1990.

References

External links 
More photos of the Chase County Courthouse at Wikimedia Commons

Courthouses on the National Register of Historic Places in Nebraska
Tudor Revival architecture in Nebraska
Government buildings completed in 1910
Buildings and structures in Chase County, Nebraska
County courthouses in Nebraska
National Register of Historic Places in Chase County, Nebraska